Miraculous conception may refer to:
 The Immaculate Conception of Mary, mother of Jesus Christ
 The Virgin Birth of Jesus
 A number of Miraculous birth traditions in history and literature